Events from the year 1748 in Canada.

Incumbents
French Monarch: Louis XV
British and Irish Monarch: George II

Governors
Governor General of New France: Roland-Michel Barrin de La Galissonière
Colonial Governor of Louisiana: Pierre de Rigaud, Marquis de Vaudreuil-Cavagnial
Governor of Nova Scotia: Paul Mascarene
Commodore-Governor of Newfoundland: Charles Watson

Events
 Louisbourg is returned to France by the Peace of Aix-la-Chapelle.
 Treaty of Aix-la-Chapelle returns Ile Royale (Cape Breton Island) and Ile Saint-Jean (Prince Edward Island) to French.
 Treaty of Logstown (English with Shawnee, Delaware, Wyandot). English later base their claim to the whole Great Lakes and midwest (or Old Northwest as it was later called) on these two treaties.

Births
 June 14: Henry Allen, evangelist, hymnist, theologian (d.1784)

Full date unknown
 James Henry Craig, officer, colonial administrator (d.1812)

Deaths

Historical documents
Paul Mascarene's lengthy summary of Nova Scotia leaders' interactions with Acadians since 1710, especially around loyalty oaths

Mascarene sends Acadian deputies long letter warning them of dire consequences for support some Acadians give to rebels ("Banditti")

Mascarene tells British secretary of state about Minas rebels influencing people, and "time and good care [needed] to wean them of that inclination"

"Almost impossible to effect their Removal without Bloodshed" - Better to keep Acadians on lands they have title to and have improved

Description of Acadian settlement Minas includes salt marsh farming, dikes and room for fortress (Note: "savages" used)

Secretary of state says settling active-duty Highland soldiers in Nova Scotia better than sending them back to Scotland

As French and British negotiators draft peace treaty, writer tells why "useless" Cape Breton Island should be returned to France

British politics and ministers' self-interest will influence whether Cape Breton is be kept or lost

Treaty clause restoring Cape Breton to France means giving up its port and fort, rich timber stands and coal mining, and strategic location

"I wish it may not prove too true" - Benjamin Franklin reports learning that 3,000 Canadians might march on Albany, New York

Huron mission at Detroit engages joiner to work in church, including altar rail, confessional and sacristy closet for altar-fronts

Comment on upper class social life in Canada ranges from Madame Lanodière's brightness to clergy's dismay at dances on feast days

Summary of conclusions made by examiners of Hudson's Bay Company policy includes its checks on settlement and increasing trade

Petitioning adventurers who sent 1746-7 expedition want permission to extend settlement and trade into continent near Hudson Bay

Employee says finally HBC will be supporting religious welfare and Christian treatment of "servants and natives"

References 

 
Canada
48